Mount McNaughton is a large mountain rising to over , and standing  south of Haworth Mesa in the western Wisconsin Range of Antarctica. It was mapped by the United States Geological Survey from surveys and U.S. Navy air photos, 1960–64, and was named by the Advisory Committee on Antarctic Names for John T. McNaughton, Assistant Secretary of Defense for International Security Affairs, a member of the Antarctic Policy Group from 1965 until his death in 1967.

References

Mountains of Marie Byrd Land